Krinos (Greek: Κρίνος) is a village in the municipal unit of Movri, Achaea, Greece. It is located 5 km southeast of Sageika and 30 km southwest of Patras, on the northwestern slope of mount Movri. Its population was 303 in 2011.

Population

External links
 Krinos GTP Travel Pages

See also

List of settlements in Achaea

References

Movri
Populated places in Achaea